Kolbäck is a locality situated in Hallstahammar Municipality, Västmanland County, Sweden with 1,951 inhabitants in 2010. The Kolbäcks VK volleyball club belongs here.

References 

Populated places in Västmanland County
Populated places in Hallstahammar Municipality